The 2022 South Dakota Coyotes football team represented the University of South Dakota in the 2022 NCAA Division I FCS football season. The Coyotes competed as members of the Missouri Valley Football Conference and were led by seventh-year head coach Bob Nielson. They played their home games at the DakotaDome in Vermillion, South Dakota.

Previous season

The Coyotes finished the 2021 season with an overall record of 7–5 and a mark of 5–3 in conference play to place in a 3 way tie for second place in the MVFC. They received an at-large bid to the FCS playoffs, where they lost to the MVFC team member Southern Illinois in the first round.

Schedule

Game summaries

at Kansas State

South Dakota did not hold up against Kansas State, failing to score the entire game.  South Dakota gave up a blocked punt that the Wildcats turned into a touchdown, couldn't stop what was called an "impressive" ground game, and gave up a touchdown in the first ten seconds.  South Dakota did hold Kansas State to just 96 passing yards.  Kansas State won the game 34-0.

at No. 3 Montana

Cal Poly

No. 1 North Dakota State

at No. 2 South Dakota State

at Illinois State

No. 14 Southern Illinois

at Youngstown State

Missouri State

at No. 19 North Dakota

Northern Iowa

References

South Dakota
South Dakota Coyotes football seasons
South Dakota Coyotes football